Hipódromo Nacional de Maroñas is a horse racing track located in Ituzaingó neighbourhood, in Montevideo, Uruguay. It has a 2,065 metres main dirt track and a dirt 2,000 metres training track. It has a seating capacity of 2,426 people and can accommodate approximately 5,500 standing.  It has a parking with room for approximately 697 cars.

The racetrack was closed between 1997 and 2003, when it was re-opened by a private consortium, Maroñas Entertainment.

Races take place all-year-round every weekend (mostly Saturdays and Sundays though sometimes only on Sundays) and also every January 6 (Three Kings Day), when its most important race, the Gran Premio José Pedro Ramírez is held.

Maroñas has 25 races in the 2018 IFHA Blue Book Part 1, including three Group 1 races (Gran Premio José Pedro Ramírez, Gran Premio Ciudad de Montevideo and Gran Premio Latinoamericano), and four Group 2 races (Gran Premio Comparación, Gran Premio Criterium, Gran Premio Estímulo and Gran Premio General Artigas).

Gallery

References

External links

 

Horse racing venues in Uruguay
Sports venues in Montevideo
Articles containing video clips